Abali Hoilett (born 26 April 1983) is a Bahamian born Caymanian cricketer.  Hoilett is a right-handed batsman who bowls right-arm off break.
 
Hoilett made a single first-class appearance for the Cayman Islands against Canada at the Toronto Cricket, Skating and Curling Club in the 2005 Intercontinental Cup.  He was dismissed for 16 runs in the Cayman Islands first-innings by Henry Osinde, while in their second-innings he was dismissed for a duck by Sunil Dhaniram.  Canada won the match by 120 runs.

He has since played for the team in the 2006 Americas Championship and the 2010 World Cricket League Division Four.

References

External links
Abali Hoilett at ESPNcricinfo
Abali Hoilett at CricketArchive

1983 births
Living people
Bahamian emigrants to the Cayman Islands
Caymanian cricketers
Bahamian cricketers